This is a list of National Collegiate Athletic Association (Philippines) seasons since 1950:

2020s
2022–23, 2021–22, 2020–21

2010s
2019–20, 2018–19, 2017–18, 2016–17, 2015–16, 2014–2015, 2013–2014 , 2012–2013,  2011–2012, 2010–2011

2000s
2009–2010, 2008–2009, 2007–2008, 2006–2007, 2005–2006, 2004–2005, 2003–2004, 2002–2003, 2001–2002, 2000–2001

1990s
1999–2000, 1998–1999, 1997–1998, 1996–1997, 1995–1996, 1994–1995, 1993–1994, 1992–1993, 1991–1992, 1990–1991

1980s
1989–1990, 1988–1989, 1987–1988, 1986–1987, 1985–1986, 1984–1985, 1983–1984, 1982–1983, 1981–1982, 1980–1981

1970s
1979–1980, 1978–1979, 1977–1978, 1976–1977, 1975–1976, 1974–1975, 1973–1974, 1972–1973, 1971–1972, 1970–1971

1960s
1969–1970, 1968–1969, 1967–1968, 1966–1967, 1965–1966, 1964–1965, 1963–1964, 1962–1963, 1961–1962, 1960–1961

1950s
1959–1960, 1958–1959, 1957–1958, 1956–1957, 1955–1956, 1954–1955, 1953–1954, 1952–1953, 1951–1952, 1950–1951

Gallery